

fm
FML-S
FML

fo

foa-fop
Foamcoat
Foamicon
Focalin
fodipir (INN)
folescutol (INN)
Folex
folic acid (INN)
Folicet
folitixorin (USAN, INN)
Follistim
follitropin alfa (INN)
follitropin beta (INN)
Follutein
Folvite
Folvron
fomepizole (INN)
fomidacillin (INN)
fominoben (INN)
fomivirsen (INN)
fomocaine (INN)
fondaparinux sodium (USAN)
fontolizumab (INN)
fonturacetam (INN)
fopirtoline (INN)

for
Foradil
Forane
forasartan (INN)
foravirumab (INN)
Forbaxin
foretinib (USAN, INN)
forfenimex (INN)
formebolone (INN)
formestane (INN)
formetorex (INN)
forminitrazole (INN)
formocortal (INN)
formoterol (INN)
forodesine (INN)
foropafant (INN)
Fortamet
Fortaz
Forteo
Fortovase

fos
fosalvudine tidoxil (INN)
Fosamax
fosaprepitant (USAN, INN)
fosarilate (INN)
fosazepam (INN)
fosbretabulin (USAN, INN)
foscarnet sodium (INN)
Foscavir
foscolic acid (INN)
fosenazide (INN)
fosfestrol (INN)
fosfluridine tidoxil (INN)
fosfocreatinine (INN)
fosfomycin (INN)
fosfonet sodium (INN)
fosfosal (INN)
fosinopril (INN)
fosinoprilat (INN)
fosmenic acid (INN)
fosmidomycin (INN)
fosopamine (INN)
fosphenytoin (INN)
fospirate (INN)
fospropofol (USAN, INN)
fosquidone (INN)
fostamatinib (USAN, INN)
fostedil (INN)
fostriecin (INN)
fosveset (USAN)

fot-foz
fotemustine (INN)
fotretamine (INN)
Fovane
fozivudine tidoxil (INN)

fr-ft
frabuprofen (INN)
fradafiban (INN)
Fragmin
framycetin (INN)
Freamine
frentizole (INN)
fresolimumab (USAN, INN)
fronepidil (INN)
Frova
frovatriptan (INN)
froxiprost (INN)
Frusehexal (Hexal Australia) [Au]. Redirects to furosemide.
FS Shampoo
ftalofyne (INN)
ftaxilide (INN)
ftivazide (INN)
ftormetazine (INN)
ftorpropazine (INN)